HMS Triad was a T-class submarine of the Royal Navy. She was laid down by Vickers Armstrong, Barrow and launched in May 1939.

Career
Triad had a relatively short career, serving in the North Sea and the Mediterranean.  In April 1940 during her patrol on the North Sea, she  sank the German troop transport  and attacked, but failed to sink the German depot ship .

Mediterranean deployment and loss

Shortly after, Triad was assigned to the Mediterranean. On 9 October 1940 she sailed from Malta to operate in the Gulf of Taranto, with orders to reach Alexandria on completion of her patrol. She failed to make port and by 20 October the submarine was declared overdue. She was believed to have been lost in a minefield or sunk by Italian anti-submarine aircraft.

For years, it was assumed that Enrico Toti had engaged and sunk , which was thought to be operating in the same area.

At the time of her sinking, Triad was commanded by Lt.Cdr. G.S. Salt, father of future Royal Naval Admiral Sam Salt.

Last action
At 01:00 on 15 October, Enrico Toti sighted a large submarine  to port: both boats manoeuvred into attack position. Italian accounts claim the British opened fire first, but all of Triads shells missed. She also fired a torpedo which Enrico Toti avoided by turning sharply, then closed on the enemy submarine at top speed, firing as she approached. Soon, machine gun fire compelled the British gunners to abandon the exposed deck. As the British submarine started to dive, Enrico Toti fired a torpedo and hit the British submarine with two 120 mm shells. The boat rose vertically then disappeared without survivors. The action lasted around 30 minutes. 

Famous Italian writer Dino Buzzati, then a very young navy war correspondent gave a lively account of the Triad vs Enrico Toti engagement.
Though he was not directly on board the Italian submarine (he would later embark on an Italian cruiser and give a first hand account of the Battle of Cape Matapan), Buzzati interviewed officers and sailors of Enrico Toti on its return to base and published the story in October 1940. According to sailors' testimonies, the commanding officer of Enrico Toti held his gun fire until he was in a favourable position to launch a torpedo, but both ships were so close that an angered Italian gunner threw his shoes at the head of his British counterpart as he could not yet fire the gun.

Until 1988 it was believed the ship sunk by Enrico Toti was Rainbow, however Rainbow is now believed to have been sunk by the Italian steamer Antonietta Costa in a collision on 4 October.

Rainbow had been ordered to leave the area on 13 October, she would have been gone 26–30 hours before the action described above began. The only boat in Enrico Totis vicinity was Triad.

Notes

References
 
 

 

British T-class submarines of the Royal Navy
Ships built in Barrow-in-Furness
1939 ships
World War II submarines of the United Kingdom
Lost submarines of the United Kingdom
Ships sunk by Italian submarines
World War II shipwrecks in the Mediterranean Sea
Maritime incidents in October 1940
Ships lost with all hands
Submarines sunk by submarines